Frank William Bullock Jr. (born November 3, 1938) is a former United States district judge of the United States District Court for the Middle District of North Carolina.

Education and career

Bullock was born in Oxford, North Carolina. He received a Bachelor of Science from University of North Carolina at Chapel Hill in 1961 and a Bachelor of Laws from University of North Carolina School of Law in 1963. He was a law clerk for Judge Algernon Lee Butler of the United States District Court for the Eastern District of North Carolina from 1963 to 1964. He was in private practice of law in Raleigh, North Carolina from 1964 to 1968. He was an assistant director for the Administrative Office of the Courts of North Carolina from 1968 to 1973. He was in private practice of law in Greensboro, North Carolina from 1973 to 1982.

Federal judicial service

Bullock was a federal judge of the United States District Court for the Middle District of North Carolina. Bullock was nominated by President Ronald Reagan on November 23, 1982, to a seat on the United States District Court for the Middle District of North Carolina vacated by Judge Eugene Andrew Gordon. He was confirmed by the United States Senate on December 10, 1982, and received his commission the same day. He served as Chief Judge from 1992 to 1999 and assumed senior status on December 31, 2005. Bullock's service was terminated on August 1, 2006, due to retirement.

References

Sources
 

1938 births
Living people
Judges of the United States District Court for the Middle District of North Carolina
United States district court judges appointed by Ronald Reagan
20th-century American judges
University of North Carolina at Chapel Hill alumni
University of North Carolina School of Law alumni